The Neue Wache is a listed building on Unter den Linden boulevard in the historic centre of Berlin, Germany. Erected from 1816 to 1818 according to plans by Karl Friedrich Schinkel as a guardhouse for the Royal Palace and a memorial to the Liberation Wars, it is considered a major work of Prussian Neoclassical architecture. A Victoria pedimental sculpture by Johann Gottfried Schadow and five General statues by Christian Daniel Rauch, referring to the Warrior statues on Schlossbrücke, also belong to the ensemble. Since 1993, the Neue Wache has been home to the Central Memorial of the Federal Republic of Germany to the Victims of War and Tyranny.

History

King Frederick William III of Prussia ordered the construction of the Neue Wache as a guardhouse for the Königliches Palais (Royal Palace), his palace across the road, to replace the old Artillery Guardhouse. He commissioned Schinkel, the leading exponent of Neoclassical architecture, to design the building: this was Schinkel's first major commission in Berlin. The Neue Wache was inaugurated on 18 September 1818 by the Prussian 1st Guards Grenadiers on occasion of the official visit of Tsar Alexander I of Russia.

Located between the Zeughaus and the Humboldt University, the plain building is characterised by four massive corner risalits and a portico of Doric columns, of the original Greek form, without bases. Schinkel wrote of his design: "The plan of this completely exposed building, free on all sides, is approximately the shape of a Roman castrum, thus the four sturdier corner towers and the inner courtyard." The statuary in the tympanum is intended as a memorial to Prussia's role in the Napoleonic Wars, whose final stage is known in Germany as the Wars of Liberation. It shows Nike, the goddess of victory, deciding a battle.  The triglyphs and guttae of the Doric order are omitted. The Jewish architect Salomo Sachs (1772–1855) claimed in his autobiography that his architectural designs for the Neue Wache, submitted in 1806 for the Academy Exhibition in Berlin, had served as the basis for Schinkel's executed plans.The building served as a royal guard house until the end of World War I and the fall of the monarchy in the German Revolution of 1918–19. In 1931 the architect Heinrich Tessenow was commissioned by the Free State of Prussia to redesign the building as a war memorial to commemorate those who died in the Great War. Tessenow converted the interior into a memorial hall centered around a black granite block with an oak wreath designed by the sculptor Ludwig Gies, situated under an oculus (circular skylight). The Neue Wache was then known as the Memorial of the Prussian State Government. After the Nazi Party took power, the building played a vital role as the site of the annual Heroes' Memorial Day celebrations held by the Nazis  and the Nazi German armed forces. The Neue Wache was heavily damaged by bombing and by artillery fire during the Battle of Berlin in the last months of World War II.

After the war, the Mitte district was located within the Soviet sector of Allied-occupied Berlin and from 1949 was part of East Berlin, the de facto, but not de jure, capital of East Germany. Prior to the 1951 communist World Festival of Youth and Students, the East German leader Walter Ulbricht had two neoclassical marble statues of Gerhard von Scharnhorst and Friedrich Wilhelm Bülow by Christian Daniel Rauch removed from the sides of the portico (positioned on the south side of Unter den Linden since 2002). From 1957 the East German authorities had the Neue Wache rebuilt and reopened in 1960 as a Memorial to the Victims of Fascism and Militarism. In 1969, the 20th anniversary of the East German state, a glass prism structure with an eternal flame was placed in the centre of the hall. The remains of an Unknown Soldier and of a nameless Nazi concentration camp victim were enshrined in the building. Two soldiers of the Friedrich Engels Guard Regiment served as permanent honor guards and a guard mounting ceremony was held every Wednesday and Saturday, becoming a major tourist attraction.

After German reunification, the Neue Wache was again rededicated in 1993 as the Central Memorial of the Federal Republic of Germany for the Victims of War and Tyranny. At the personal suggestion of the Federal Chancellor of Germany Helmut Kohl, the East German memorial piece was removed and replaced by an enlarged version of Käthe Kollwitz's sculpture Mother with her Dead Son. The pietà-style sculpture is directly placed under the oculus, and so is exposed to the rain, snow and cold of the Berlin climate, symbolizing the suffering of civilians during World War II. In addition, there has been discussion about returning the neoclassical statues back to their original places (next to and opposite the Neue Wache) where the East German authorities had them removed from.

See also
La Madeleine, Paris (Paris, France)
Kazan Cathedral, Saint Petersburg (Saint Petersburg, Russia)
Palais Bourbon (Paris, France)
Palais Brongniart (Paris, France)

References

External links
 
 "The National Memorial to the Victims of War and Tyranny: From Conflict To Consensus", lecture with handout and bibliography by Harold Marcuse, covers history since 1816.
 Neue Wache travel photos by Galen Fry Singer, of facade, sculpture and inscriptions.

1816 establishments in Germany
1816 establishments in Prussia
Buildings and structures in Mitte
Karl Friedrich Schinkel buildings
Prussian cultural sites
Sculptures of men in Germany
Sculptures of women in Germany
Statues in Germany
Tourist attractions in Berlin
World War I memorials in Germany